Darius Hamilton (born December 29, 1993) is an American football defensive end who is currently a free agent. He attended Rutgers University.

High school career
A native of Woodland Park, New Jersey (formerly known as West Paterson), Hamilton attended powerhouse Don Bosco Preparatory High School in Ramsey, New Jersey, where he was an All-American defensive lineman. Don Bosco won back-to-back New Jersey state championships in 2010 and 2011, finishing the 2011 season as the No. 1 team in the nation according to USA Today. He participated in the 2012 U.S. Army All-American Bowl following his senior season.

Regarded as a five-star recruit by Rivals.com, Hamilton was ranked as the No. 2 strongside defensive end prospect in his class. Labelled New Jersey's most sought-after recruit since Eugene Monroe in 2005, Hamilton picked Rutgers over Miami (FL).

College career
Described as the "gem of the highest-rated recruiting class in Rutgers history", Hamilton was the only true freshman in the regular rotation on offense or defense in 2012. He was named a captain for the 2014 season as a junior.

Hamilton injured his knee on September 27, 2015, causing him to miss the remainder of the season. He returned to Rutgers for a fifth year, conditional on whether he is granted a redshirt.

Professional career
In 2018, Hamilton joined the Salt Lake Stallions of the Alliance of American Football. The league ceased operations in April 2019.

Personal
Hamilton is the son of Rosita Collazo and Keith Hamilton, who played twelve years in the National Football League for the New York Giants.

References

External links
Rutgers Scarlet Knights bio

1993 births
Living people
American football defensive ends
People from Woodland Park, New Jersey
Players of American football from New Jersey
Rutgers Scarlet Knights football players
Salt Lake Stallions players